is a passenger railway station located in the town of Harima, Kako District, Hyōgo Prefecture, Japan, operated by the West Japan Railway Company (JR West).

Lines

Station layout
The station consists of one ground-level side platform and one ground-level island platform connected by an elevated station building. The station has a Midori no Madoguchi staffed ticket office. Track 1 serves westbound trains to Kobe and Ōsaka while track 3 serves eastbound trains to Himeji; track 2 is bi-directional and handles trains going to either terminus depending on the time of day.

Platforms

Adjacent stations

|-
!colspan=5|JR West

History
Tsuchiyama Station opened on 23 December 1888. With the privatization of the Japan National Railways (JNR) on 1 April 1987, the station came under the aegis of the West Japan Railway Company.

Station numbering was introduced in March 2018 with Tsuchiyama being assigned station number JR-A77.

Passenger statistics
In fiscal 2019, the station was used by an average of 14,201 passengers daily

Surrounding area
 Hyogo Prefectural Archaeological Museum 
 Harima Onaka Ancient Village 
 Harima Town Folk Museum

See also
List of railway stations in Japan

References

External links

 JR West Station Official Site

Railway stations in Hyōgo Prefecture
Sanyō Main Line
Railway stations in Japan opened in 1888
Harima, Hyōgo